The Violet of Potsdamer Platz (German: Das Veilchen vom Potsdamer Platz) is a 1936 German drama film directed by Johann Alexander Hübler-Kahla and starring Rotraut Richter, Margarete Kupfer and Else Elster. It was shot at the Marienfelde Studios in Berlin. The film's sets were designed by the art directors Gustav A. Knauer and Alexander Mügge.

Synopsis
In Berlin, an old cavalry horse from the First World War is threatened with slaughter. A young flower seller from Potsdamer Platz attempts to save it with the assistance of her grandfather and other well-meaning people.

Cast
 Rotraut Richter as Mariechen Bindedraht 
 Paul W. Krüger as Vater Pietsch - Droschkenkutscher 
 Margarete Kupfer as Mutter Pietsch 
 Else Elster as Rosa - ihre Enkelin 
 Fritz Kampers as Otto Schnöcker 
 Anton Pointner as Seidewind 
 Paul Westermeier as Knallkopp 
 Hermann Schomberg as Schupo Lemke 
 Hans Richter as Fritz 
 Alfred Beierle as Held - Geldverleiher 
 Otto Kronburger as Hansen - Kriminalrat 
 Lotte Werkmeister as Blumenfrau

References

Bibliography 
 Klaus, Ulrich J. Deutsche Tonfilme: Jahrgang 1936. Klaus-Archiv, 1988.
 Rentschler, Eric. The Ministry of Illusion: Nazi Cinema and Its Afterlife. Harvard University Press, 1996.

External links 
 

1936 films
Films of Nazi Germany
German drama films
German black-and-white films
1936 drama films
1930s German-language films
Films directed by Johann Alexander Hübler-Kahla
Films set in Berlin
Films shot in Berlin
Films about horses
Tobis Film films
1930s German films
Films shot at Terra Studios